Frank Hoffman may refer to:

Frank "Nordy" Hoffman (1909–1996), American college football player and the Sergeant at Arms of the United States Senate
Frank Hoffmann (Canadian football) (born 1980), Canadian football guard
Frank Hoffman (baseball), 19th-century baseball player
Frank Sargent Hoffman (1852–1928), American philosopher
Frank Hoffman (artist), see Harold Dow Bugbee

See also
Frank Hoffmann (disambiguation)